Coleophora tenuis is a moth of the family Coleophoridae. It is found in the United States, including California.

References

tenuis
Moths of North America
Moths described in 1882